MoonArk is a Moon museum made by Carnegie Mellon University which is planned to go to the Moon on the upcoming Astrobotic Technologies Peregrine lunar lander. It will be mounted to the main deck of the lander.

Development
MoonArk contains four Chambers:
Ether
Moon
Metasphere
Earth

MoonArk was made in 2008.
There are actually twin Moon Arks – one that will go to the Moon and another that will be shown in traveling displays around the world.
The final assembly of the Moon ark that will go to the Moon occurred June 2, 2021.

Contents
The Ark contains:
The DNA of a goat
A vial containing the blood of 33 artists
Hundreds of images
Pieces of music
Poems
River water
Ocean water
Gemstones
Miniature murals, such as Moonscape, a metal mural by artist Dylan Vitone, which measures roughly 1.5 inches by 4.5 inches.
Arctic tern DNA
Coal
Rock
Hopi corn
A fragrance sample
A collection of tiny drawings
Maps

It is 3D printed using a 3D Systems ProX200 3D printer supplied by 3rd Dimension Industrial 3D Printing.
Laser engraved murals of UNESCO World Heritage Sites are made by MECCO. 
It is constructed at James Madison University.

Exhibitions
While awaiting launch both MoonArks travel around the world going to exhibitions.
Some of them include:
 A MESSAGE TO SPACE at SUPERCOLLIDER GALLERY
Vasarely Museum
Carnegie Museum of Natural History
Centre Pompidou
New Worlds Conference
Municipal Art Gallery of Bydgoszcz
Thrival Festival

References

External links 
 Official website

Peregrine Payloads
Time capsules
Carnegie Mellon University